FC Dostyk (Dostyq Fýtbol Klýby) were a Kazakhstani football club based in Almaty. The club were accepted to the Kazakhstan Super League 1993 and won the Group A preliminary stage of that competition (although they did not go on and win the title). The same season also saw the club capture the Kazakhstan Cup, defeating FC Taraz 4–2 in the final. Despite this early success Dostyk resigned from the league in the start of 1994 season.

Achievements
Kazakhstan Cup: 1
1993

Dostyk, FC
Dostyk, FC
1993 establishments in Kazakhstan
Association football clubs established in 1993